Rosenburg or Rosenborg is an unincorporated community in Platte County, Nebraska, United States.

History
Rosenburg had a post office from 1901 until 1904. The first postmaster, Eske Petersen, named Rosenburg after a place in his native Denmark.

References

Unincorporated communities in Platte County, Nebraska
Unincorporated communities in Nebraska